Estanislao del Canto Arteaga (1840 – June 23, 1923) was a Chilean military figure who played a major role in the War of the Pacific (1879-1883) and the Chilean Civil War (1891).  He also participated in the Occupation of the Araucanía (1861-1883) and the Chincha Islands War  (1864-1865).

References

1840 births
1923 deaths
People from Quillota
Chilean people of Spanish descent
Chilean Army generals
Chilean Freemasons
People of the Occupation of Araucanía
Chilean military personnel of the Chincha Islands War
Chilean military personnel of the War of the Pacific
People of the Chilean Civil War of 1891 (Congresistas)